Maria Adams may refer to:

 Maria Hoadley Adams, wife of John Adams who owns John and Maria Adams House 
 Maria Adams, a woman kidnapped and sold into slavery by John Crenshaw

See also
Marie Adams (disambiguation)
Mary Adams (disambiguation)